NGC 5308 is an edge-on lenticular galaxy in the constellation of Ursa Major. It was discovered on 19 March 1790 by William Herschel. It was described by John Louis Emil Dreyer as "bright, pretty large" when he compiled the New General Catalogue. A small, irregular galaxy near NGC 5308 has been given the designation LEDA 2802348.

NGC 5308 was imaged by the Hubble Space Telescope in 2016. The galaxy appears to be a flat, smooth disk, typical of most lenticular galaxies. Many large globular clusters orbit the galaxy; these are visible as tiny dots surrounding the galaxy, and are mostly made of old, aging stars similar to the galaxy itself.

SN 1996bk, a type Ia supernova, was discovered in NGC 5308 in October 1996. The supernova was 10.5" south and 17.9" west of center of the galaxy, and had an apparent visual magnitude of 15.

References

External links
 

5308
08722
048860
Lenticular galaxies
Ursa Major (constellation)